Sankharavam is a 2004 Telugu film directed by A. Mohana Gandhi and starring Anant Nag, Sarath Babu, Srinath and Rajiv Kanakala.

Plot

Cast
Anant Nag as Chandra Rayudu
Sarath Babu as Rajendra Reddy
Srinath
Rajiv Kanakala
Krishna Bhagawan
Amrutha
AVS
Siva Krishna
Jaya Prakash Reddy
Raghunatha Reddy
Ahuti Prasad
Surya

References

2004 films
2000s Telugu-language films
Films directed by A. Mohan Gandhi